Latifur is a given name. Notable people with the given name include:

Latifur Khan, Bangladeshi computer scientist
Latifur Rahman (1936–2017), Bangladeshi politician
Latifur Rahman (businessman) (died 2020), Bangladeshi comprador and businessman
Latifur Rahman (politician), Bangladeshi politician